Canadian cuisine consists of the cooking traditions and practices of Canada, with regional variances around the country. First Nations and Inuit have practiced their own culinary traditions in what is now Canada since time immemorial. The advent of European explorers and settlers, first on the east coast and then throughout the wider territories of New France, British North America and Canada, saw the melding of foreign recipes, cooking techniques, and ingredients with indigenous flora and fauna. Modern Canadian cuisine has maintained this dedication to local ingredients and terroir, as exemplified in the naming of specific ingredients based on their locale, such as Malpeque oysters or Alberta beef. Accordingly, Canadian cuisine privileges the quality of ingredients and regionality, and may be broadly defined as a national tradition of "creole" culinary practices, based on the complex multicultural and geographically diverse nature of both historical and contemporary Canadian society.

Divisions within Canadian cuisine can be traced along regional lines and have a direct connection to the historical immigration patterns of each region or province. The earliest cuisines of Canada are based on Indigenous, English, Scottish and French roots. The traditional cuisines of both French- and English-Canada have evolved from those carried over to North America from France and the British Isles respectively, and from their adaptation to Indigenous customs, labour-intensive and/or mobile lifestyles, and hostile environmental conditions. French Canadian cuisine can also be divided into Québécois cuisine and Acadian cuisine. Regional cuisines have continued to develop with subsequent waves of immigration during the 19th, 20th, and 21st centuries, such as from Central Europe, Southern Europe, Eastern Europe, South Asia, East Asia, and the Caribbean. There are many culinary practices and dishes that can be either identified as particular to Canada, such fish and brewis, peameal bacon, and ginger beef, or sharing an association with countries from which immigrants to Canada carried over their cuisine, such as pierogies, roast beef, and bannock.

Definitions

Though certain dishes may be identified as "Canadian" due to the ingredients used or the origin of their inception, an overarching style of Canadian cuisine may be more difficult to define. Some commentators, such as the former prime minister Joe Clark, believe Canadian cuisine to be a collage of dishes from a variety of cultures. Clark himself has been paraphrased to have noted that "Canada has a cuisine of cuisines. Not a stew pot, but a smorgasbord." Canadian food culture writer and author Jennifer Cochrall-King has said that "there is no single definition of Canadian cuisine. It starts with ingredients that spring from the landscape and with traditional dishes steeped in the region's history and culture."

While the immense size of Canada, and the diversity of its inhabitants, compounds the difficulty in identifying a monolithic Canadian culinary tradition, Hersch Jacobs acknowledges that the lack of a hegemonic definition does not preclude the existence of Canadian cuisine. Lenore Newman argues that there is a distinctly Canadian creole cuisine, and identifies five key properties that together define Canadian cuisine: its reliance on seasonality, multiculturalism, wild foods, regional dishes, and the privileging of ingredients over recipes. This adaptation, preparation, and emphasis on specific local ingredients is of particular note, and a common theme in Canadian food is the use of foreign recipes, introduced by immigrants and their descendants, that have been modified for use of local products. Tourtière, for example, is a Canadian meat pie of French origin that can be cooked with beef, pork or fish. The sections on regionality and national foods below illustrate this tradition of diversity and emphasis on local elements, such as dulse and lobster in the Maritimes, deer meats in the Northern Territories, salmon and crab in British Columbia, or maple syrup in Central Canada.

Indigenous food may be considered uniquely Canadian, and the influence of Métis culture can be considered to have played a particularly important role in the origin of a distinct Canadian cuisine. Foods such as bannock, moose, deer, bison, pemmican, maple taffy, and Métis stews, such as barley stew, are all either traditional Indigenous foods, or originate from Canada with roots in Indigenous cuisines, and are eaten throughout the country.

There are many foods of foreign origin that are eaten commonly and considered integrated constituents of Canadian cuisine. Pierogies (dumplings of Central and Eastern European origin) are an example of this, due to the large number of early Ukrainian and Polish immigrants, while the ubiquity of roast beef and Yorkshire pudding are an example of the heavy English influence. As much of Canadian cuisine is coloured by the adaptation and development of dishes brought over by European, and later Asian, settlers, there is a variety of noteworthy Canadian variations on pre-established, templated food and drink, with their own nationally defined particularities, such as Canadian cheddar cheese, whisky, bread, wine, bacon, and pancakes.

In general, much of what is considered to be traditional Canadian cuisine contains strong elements of richness, breads and starches, game meat, and often stews and soups. Certain culinary traditions in Canada, such as the frying of dough, which developed out of the country's voyaging and frontier culture, have seen to both the creation of distinct national foods and the flourishing of a broader national association with certain types of dishes. In the case of frying dough, for example, particular foods originating form Canada would include beavertails, apple fritters and toutons, whilst foods such as doughnuts, cronuts, bannock, bagels, and pancakes, though not physically originating from Canada, have nonetheless developed within a broader tradition of nationally recognized cuisine.

History

Canadian cuisine has been shaped by the historical and ongoing influences of indigenous peoples, settlers and immigrants. Indigenous influences remain prevalent in Canada's contemporary food scene, alongside those of the three major immigrant groups of the 17th and 18th centuries: English, Scottish, and French. This diversity has been further expanded by subsequent waves of immigration in later centuries.

Indigenous 

The traditional Indigenous cuisine of Canada is based on a mixture of wild game, foraged foods, and farmed agricultural products. Indigenous peoples are known to have used more than five-hundred plant species for food. They cultivated and foraged a variety of plants, hunted a diversity of animals, and used various tools to boil, smoke/preserve and roast their food. Each region of Canada, with its own First Nations and Inuit peoples, utilized local resources and distinct preparation techniques for their cuisines.

Maple syrup was first collected and used by the aboriginal people of Eastern Canada and the north-eastern United States, and Canada remains the world's largest producer. Though the origin of maple syrup production is not clear, the earliest known syrups were made by repeatedly freezing the collected maple sap and removing the ice to concentrate the sugar in the remaining sap. Maple syrup is one of the most commonly consumed Canadian food of Aboriginal origin.

In particular, the former was a predecessor for North American-style beef jerky, with the processing methods adapted for beef.

In most of the Canadian West Coast and Pacific Northwest, Pacific salmon was an important food resource to the First Nations peoples, along with certain marine mammals. Salmon were consumed fresh during the spawning season, or smoked dry to create a jerky-like food that could be stored year-round. The latter food is commonly known and sold as "salmon jerky".

It is known for being a kidney tonic, which are called agutak in Arctic Canada (with animal/fish fat).

In the Arctic, Inuit traditionally survived on a diet consisting of land and marine mammals, fish, and foraged plant products. Meats were consumed fresh, but also often prepared, cached, and allowed to ferment into igunaq or kiviak. These fermented meats have the consistency and smell of certain soft aged cheeses. Snacks such as muktuk, which consist of whale skin and blubber is eaten plain, though occasionally dipped in soy sauce. Chunks of muktuk are sliced with an ulu prior to or during consumption.

Fish are eaten boiled, fried, and prior to today's settlements, often in dried forms. The so-called "Eskimo potato", (Inuit: oak-kuk: Claytonia tuberosa) and other "mousefoods", are some of the plants consumed in the Arctic.

Foods such as "bannock", popular with First Nations and Inuit, reflect the historic exchange of these cultures with European fur traders, who brought with them new ingredients and foods. Common contemporary consumption of bannock, powdered milk, and bologna by aboriginal Canadians reflects the legacy of Canadian colonialism in the prohibition of hunting and fishing, and the institutional food rations provided to Indian reserves. Due to similarities in treatment under colonialism, many Native American communities throughout the continent consume similar food items, with some emphasis on local ingredients.

North and West European 

Settlers and traders from the British Isles account for the culinary influences of early English Canada in the Maritime provinces and Southern Ontario (Upper Canada). Cuisines found in Newfoundland and the Maritimes derive largely from British and Irish cooking, with a preference for salt-cured fish, beef, and pork. Ontario, Manitoba and British Columbia also maintain strong British culinary traditions. The French settlers of New France, who would become the Canadiens and Acadians, account for much of the cuisine of southern Quebec (Lower Canada), Northeastern Ontario, and New Brunswick.

Seafood had an important influence on the early European settlers and explorers of Atlantic Canada, which continues to be expressed in Maritime cuisine and culture to this day. In the late 15th-century, John Cabot's journey to the shores of what would become Newfoundland brought England knowledge of the Grand Banks and their abundance in cod. He is reported to have told King Henry VII that "the sea was covered with fish which could be caught not merely by nets, but weighted basket lowered into the water." Fleets of fishermen from England, France, Portugal, and Spain flocked to Newfoundland to return with fish, filling a market need in Europe and cutting out the necessity of importing from Iceland. The English, Scottish, Irish, and French settlers of what would become the Atlantic provinces frequently built their communities beside the ocean and rivers for easy access, and the fishing industry along the Canadian east coast steadily expanded until it became the region's major industry. Accounts from early settlers list fish that were caught, sold, and incorporated into local meals, such as trout, eels, mackerel, oysters, lobsters, salmon, cod and herring. Meals that incorporated such fish included, and continue to include, fried cod roe, fried or baked cod tongues, stewed or fried cod heads, fish hash, codfish balls, cod sounds, toast and fish, roasted scrawn, fish and brewis, salt fish and potatoes, and boiled rounders, among others. The abundance of seafood and the ease by which it could be obtained made the British and French colonies of Nova Scotia, New Brunswick, Acadia, Prince Edward Island, and Newfoundland and Labrador attractive destinations for settlers.

The influx of United Empire Loyalists into British North America in the 18th century, and the subsequent establishment of Upper Canada, saw the wider expansion of British cooking with indigenous ingredients in the future province of Ontario. These settlers established customs similar to their compatriots in England, but with a particular focus on dietary staples, such as meat, bread, and tea. Local forage and game were typically incorporated into the cooking of early English-Canadians in Upper Canada, such as wild berries, maple sugar, venison, partridge, waterfowl, maize, pumpkin, and turkey. Meals often contained more meat than was typical in England and were particularly reliant on pork and potatoes during early settlement, although these meals began to include beef and mutton as farming became more established in the region. Roasting was a common method of cooking for Upper Canadians, and Scottish immigration, largely onset by the Highland Clearances, brought a wider emphasis on mutton.

The Victorian era saw a greater swell of British immigration to Upper Canada, Lower Canada, and the Atlantic colonies, and the urban and rural development that followed encouraged the spread of eating establishments, local cookbooks, and a busier ingredients market. By the mid-19th century, there was a tavern every couple odd miles along the major roads of Upper Canada, and there were reportedly twenty-nine alone along the route between Halifax and Digby, Nova Scotia. The larger urban centres, such as Toronto, Kingston, and Coburg in Upper Canada, Montreal and Quebec City in Lower Canada, and Halifax in Nova Scotia, saw the opening of hotels that could better serve a burgeoning upper class of Victorian patrons. These hotels, broadly, provided beef steak, fried pork, buckwheat cakes, roast beef and pork, wild game and fowl, vegetables, pudding, and tea. Cookbooks published during this period include The Home Cookbook (1877) and The Galt Cook Book (1898). Traditions that developed out of the Victorian era in Canada include the Victorian cooking fireplace, which saw continued use in homes and restaurants even after the metal stove was introduced, and picnics, which often involved ham, fowl, meat pies, tarts, and cakes.

In the territory of Rupert's Land, the development of communities throughout the 17th, 18th, and early 19th centuries, which centered around Hudson Bay Company and North West Company trading posts, saw to the intermingling of European (largely Scottish and French) traders, clerks, guides, and canoers with the local Indigenous population. The resulting genesis of the Métis culture saw to the development of a cuisine in the Canadian West which combined the culinary traditions of these previously separate groups.
With the arrival of the Earl of Selkirk and his Scottish retinue (people largely displaced by the Highland Clearances), as well as the purchase of forty-five million acres of land in the Red River Valley, many Scottish culinary traditions were brought to the region. These foods included black bun, haggis, honey cakes, and rowies. Cooperation with the local Métis saw Scottish immigrants hunting buffalo and incorporating game into their meals.
The completion of the Canadian Pacific Railway in the late 19th-century led to a significant influx of not just settlers of British origin, but of also a multitude of different backgrounds, notably Ukrainian, Polish, German, Scandinavian, Belgian, Dutch, Greek, Czech, Slovak, Chinese, American, Mennonite, and Jewish. It is in this way that the Canadian Prairies, or the future provinces of Alberta, Saskatchewan, and Manitoba, were a frontier of multicultural community-building in Canada, and the creation of a regional cuisine which absorbed influences from a variety of ethnic, national, and religious backgrounds.

Icelandic immigration has a particular influence on the cuisine of Manitoba, which, besides Iceland itself, has a larger Icelandic population than anywhere else in the world. One example is vinarterta, a layer cake filled with prune jam and flavoured with cardamom, and a popular Christmas treat in Manitoba. Bakeries in the province often include other pastries brought over and adapted from Iceland, including kleinur (similar to doughnuts), laufabrauõ (flatbread decorated with patterns), kransakaka (a type of cake with almonds), and ugbraud (a rye bread).

Ontario's southwestern regions also have strong Dutch and Scandinavian influences.

Central and East European 

In Canada's Prairie provinces, which saw significant immigration from Eastern and Northern Europe in the pre-WWI era, Ukrainian, German, and Polish cuisines are strong culinary influences. Such examples include perogies, kielbasa, and babka. Emigration from Russia to Western Canada in the late 19th and early 20th centuries also established a Doukhobor influence, noted in particular for its emphasis on vegetarian recipes on the cuisine of the British Columbia Interior and the Prairies.

The Waterloo, Ontario, region and the southern portion of Manitoba have traditions of Mennonite and German cookery.

Jewish immigrants to Canada during the late 1800s played a significant culinary role within Canada, chiefly renowned for Montreal-style bagels and Montreal-style smoked meat. A regional variation of both emerged within Winnipeg, Manitoba's Jewish community, which also derived Winnipeg-style cheesecake from New York City recipes. Winnipeg has given birth to numerous other unique dishes, such as the schmoo torte, smoked goldeye and "co-op style" rye bread and cream cheese.

East Asian 

Chinese immigration to Canada, beginning predominantly in the 1850s, saw to the local modification of dishes imported from Qing China. Much of what are considered to be "Chinese dishes" in Canada are largely Canadian or North American inventions, with Chinese restaurants having tailored their traditional cuisine to local tastes, local ingredients, and a largely non-Chinese clientele. This "Canadian Chinese cuisine" is widespread across the country, with great variation from place to place. Examples of such variation are seen in unique regional dishes, including Calgary ginger beef, Montreal peanut-butter dumplings, Newfoundland chow mein, and Thunder Bay bon bons.

The "Chinese buffet", although found in other parts of North America, traces its origins to early Gastown, Vancouver, c.1870. This meal format developed from the practice of Chinese restaurateurs providing a steam table on a sideboard to serve Scandinavian lumberjacks working in local forests and mills.

Japanese-Canadians have had a profound influence on the cuisines of British Columbia and Ontario. Distinct varieties of sushi, such as the B.C. roll and the California roll, originate from the Metro Vancouver region, while sushi pizza was invented in Toronto. Japadog street food in Vancouver is also a popular example of Canadian west coast fusion cuisine.

South Asian 

Indian and South Asian culinary influences are a relatively recent addition to Canadian cuisine, having gained wider prominence in the country during the post-1960's era of immigration, despite earlier South Asian settlement in British Columbia dating back to the late 19th century. Indian food is particularly popular in Canada, deriving mostly from Northern Indian cuisine. It is characterized for its use of bread, curry, and use of yogurt and cream for meat-based dishes; it also draws inspiration from South Indian cuisine in its use of sour and spicy combinations.

Unique Indo-Canadian food includes the East Indian roti wrap, which gained popularity in Toronto during the 1980s and 1990s; using North Indian/Pakistani bread and curries as stuffing, local chefs originally drew inspiration from the West Indian roti which had entered the city's food scene in the 1960s and 1970s after a wave of Caribbean immigration. Also known as butter chicken roti, the dish is served at many Indian restaurants and fast food locations across Southern Ontario.

Other Canadian food unique to the South Asian community includes "Indian-style pizza" (also known as "Punjabi-style pizza" or "Desi-style pizza") which has gradually gained popularity since the 1980s in major urban centres across western and central Canada with large South Asian populations, including Greater Vancouver, Calgary, Edmonton, Regina, Winnipeg, Ottawa, and Greater Toronto, later expanding to other regions. This type of pizza typically includes sauce with mixed spices and toppings such as cilantro, ginger, spinach, cauliflower, tandoori chicken, butter chicken, or paneer.

Southeast Asian 

Contributions from Southeast Asia to Canadian cuisine includes a style of medium-thick crust pizza Margherita in Toronto. An example of fusion cuisine, the pizza is topped with garlic and basil oil topping, combining an Italian pizza with the Vietnamese tradition of using herbed oil toppings in food.

Regional ingredients

While numerous and varied ingredients are commonly found throughout Canada, each region, with its own tradition of culinary development, utilizes locally derived ingredients, both wild and agricultural, which are used to define unique dishes. The table below is meant to provide particular examples of regional staples and their key local ingredient.

Wild game of all sorts is still hunted and eaten by many Canadians, though not commonly in urban centres. Venison, from white-tailed deer, moose, elk (wapiti) or caribou, is eaten across the country and is considered quite important to many First Nations cultures. Seal meat is eaten, particularly in the Canadian North, the Maritimes, and Newfoundland and Labrador. Wild fowl like ducks and geese, grouse (commonly called partridge) and ptarmigan are also regularly hunted. Other animals like bear and beaver may be eaten by dedicated hunters or indigenous people, but are not generally consumed by much of the population.

Seafood is a very common constituent of Canadian cuisine broadly, but particularly in British Columbia and the Atlantic provinces. West Coast salmon varieties include sockeye, coho, chinook (also known as king), and pink, while salmon used on the East Coast can be broadly defined as Atlantic salmon. Freshwater fish, such as the walleye (also known as pickerel) and lake whitefish are commercially fished in the Great Lakes and are popular in southern Ontario. Both wild-caught and farmed rainbow trout are consumed throughout Canada.

Although the majority of Canada's fish yield is captured wild, about 28% of the country's yield came from aquaculture in 2018. British Columbia accounts for 49% of the country's total aquaculture production volume, while the Maritime provinces account for 46%. Canada is the world's fourth-largest producer of farmed salmon, and other species, such as trout, Arctic char, mussels, oysters, and clams are well established industries.

Forage in Canadian cooking can include a variety of berries, mushrooms, Canada rice and herbs. Wild chanterelle, pine, morel, lobster, puffball, and other mushrooms are commonly consumed. Gooseberries, salmonberries, cranberries, strawberries, Saskatoonberries, cloudberries, soapberries, blackberries, blueberries, bilberries, currants, and huckleberries are gathered wild or grown.

Alberta is renowned for its production of beef; in 2016, Alberta's cattle herd accounted for 41.6% of the national total. Alberta beef is thought to have a rich marbled flavour due to the province's nutritious grasslands and barley. Examples of local recipes that utilize Alberta beef include beef tartare, bistecca, short ribs, ginger fried beef, and grilled steak. Canada ranks among the world's top 10 per capita consumers of beef.

Saskatchewan is often referred to as the "breadbasket of Canada"; it accounts for nearly 50% of Canada's total crop yield and for two-fifths of the country's total field acreage. In 2016, canola and spring wheat were the two largest crops, Saskatoon berries accounted for over half of the "fruit, berry and nut area", and sweet corn was the largest field vegetable crop by area. Saskatchewan also produces most of the country's spice yield, particularly mustard, but also caraway and coriander.

Canadian foods

Main dishes, side dishes and appetizers
Although there are considerable overlaps between Canadian culinary practices and those of the British Isles, France and the rest of North America, many dishes (or variations of imported dishes) are particular to, quintessential of, or available only in Canada.

Breads

Miscellaneous

Pizza

Seafood

Soups and stews

Pastries and desserts
There is an abundance of unique pastries and desserts that originate from Canada, as accounted for in the list below. Over twenty-one hundred bakery product manufacturing establishments, and more than twelve hundred retail bakeries, operate in the country. Tim Hortons, a Canadian restaurant chain that specialized in baked goods, maintains the highest number of franchises in the country.
 Apple fritter—deep fried pastry rolled with apple and cinnamon, broken into pieces and then reformed into a single mass, then glazed with icing.
 Beaver tails—also known as elephant ears, moose antlers, dog ears, whale tails, or simply fried dough.
 Blueberry grunt—sweetened and stewed blueberries topped with a biscuit or dumpling.
 Brownie dominoes with wild blueberry cinnamon sauce—British Columbia regional delicacy; chocolate brownies topped with sauce made of wild B.C. blueberries and heated cinnamon.
 Butter tarts—said to be invented in Eastern Ontario around 1915. The main ingredients for the filling include butter, sugar and eggs, but raisins and pecans are often added for additional flavour.
 Canadian maple donut—similar to a Boston cream doughnut; a custard-filled, solid pastry with a maple frosting.
 Cinnamon buns—Canadian variation of the cinnamon roll. One British Columbia variation includes apple and cranberry.
 Date square (also called "Date crumblies" or "Matrimonial cake")—date-filled desserts with an oatmeal crumb topping.
 Dutchie—a square, yeast-lifted doughnut containing raisins and coated with a sugary glaze.
 Girl Guide Cookies—chocolate and vanilla cream-filled cookies, as well as chocolate mint. Traditionally sold by the Girl Guides of Canada since 1927.
 Glazed maple shortbread cookies—typically served during Canada Day celebrations.
 Grands-pères—dough dumplings boiled in maple syrup.
 Jam busters—prairie jelly doughnuts
 Maple leaf cream cookies—"sandwich cookie" containing maple-flavoured cream. 
 Moosehunters—molasses cookies.
 Nanaimo bars—consists of three layers: a wafer, nut (walnuts, almonds, or pecans), and coconut crumb base; custard icing in the middle; and a layer of chocolate ganache on top. Most common in British Columbia, gaining its name sake from the Vancouver Island town of Nanaimo, BC.
 Nanaimo balls—a bite-sized variation of the British Columbian classic. Considered a Christmas treat.
 Passion flakes—pastry sandwich filled with raspberries or apple jam, and vanilla frosting or whipped cream.
 Persians—somewhat like a cross between a large cinnamon bun and a doughnut, topped with strawberry icing; particular to Thunder Bay.
 Pets de sœurs—"nuns’ farts", pastry dough wrapped around a brown sugar and butter filling.
 Pinecone gingerbread cookies—pinecone-shaped gingerbread cookies.
 Pouding chômeur—"poor man's pudding".
 Queen Elizabeth cake—a lightly sweet, moist, and low-fat date (fruit) cake, topped with a brown sugar, butter and coconut broiled topping.
 Schmoo torte—a torte with layered whipped cream, caramel, and nuts, commonly made using angel food or sponge cake.
 Sweet bannock—a piece of bannock sweetened with cinnamon and sugar, or made into bread pudding with berries.
 Tea biscuit—similar to the North American biscuit or scone; quickbread typically made with cheese and herbs.
 Timbits—fried balls of dough taken from the center of a doughnut, provided in a variety of flavours and toppings.

Confection
 Candy apple—also known as "toffee apple".
 Figgy duff—pudding from Newfoundland containing molasses and raisins.
 Maple syrup—especially as tire d'érable sur la neige or "maple toffee" or "taffy". Often used as flavouring (such as in "maple leaf cream cookies", "grandpères", or "Canadian maple donuts").
 Maple taffy—a sugar candy made by pouring hot maple sap onto snow.
 Nougabricot—preserve consisting of apricots, almonds, and pistachios.
 Sucre à la crème—French-Canadian name for Scottish "tablets".
 Sxusem—whipped confection made from soapberries and other various fruits
 Tiger tail ice cream—orange flavoured ice cream with a black liquorice swirl.

Pie
 Bakeapple pie—traditional pie from Newfoundland containing cloudberries.
 Bumbleberry pie—"bumbleberry" is a mixture of fruit, berries, and rhubarb.
 Flapper pie—also known as "wafer pie" in Winnipeg; a custard pie popular in Western Canada.
 Maple syrup pie—similar to chess pie, using maple syrup.
 Saskatoonberry pie—pie made from Saskatoon berries.
 Tarte au sucre ("sugar pie")—based on the French dessert.

Cheese

Dairy products became prominent among Central Canadian producers in the 1860s. Ontario's first cheese factory opened in 1863, and by the end of the decade, they had expanded to over two-hundred. The 1860s also saw to the start of a shift from wheat production to dairy and livestock in Quebec, which would become the dominant agricultural sector in the province by the early 20th century. Cream and cheese factory production would begin to increase exponentially in both Central and Eastern Canada by the 1880s.

Canada is currently the 12th largest producer of cheese by tonnage, and is considered to be one of the major cheese-producing countries. Canadian cheese is mostly "firm", with cheddar and mozzarella being the most produced varieties in 2020. Among Canadians, specialty cheese (such as cream cheese, cottage cheese, and parmesan) is the most popular type, with cheddar being the second-most. The list given below, taken from an international database of cheese varieties, is an account of over one-hundred Canadian cheeses:

Commercially-prepared food, condiments and beverages

 Baby food
 Love Child Organics
 Pablum
 Pure Organic Baby Food
 Mother Hen
 Bread
 Brands (bakeries): Ben's, Bon Matin, Dempster's, POM, Stonemill, Villaggio
 Canadian white bread, simply referred to as "white bread" in Canada, is distinct from its international counterparts due to the high protein content of Canadian wheat, as required by the Canadian Grain Commission, which gives it a heartier consistency.
 Candy/ sweets 
 Chocolate bars: Coffee Crisp, Mr. Big, Caramilk, Big Turk, Cherry Blossom, Crunchie, Crispy Crunch, Aero, Pal-o-mine, Eat-more Chocolate bar
 Tablet candy: Bridge mixture (bridge mix), Canadian Smarties., Glosette pieces (peanut, raisin, or almonds)
 Toffee: Templeman's Toffees, Two Brothers Toffee, Canadian Mackintosh's Toffee
 Cereal 
 Anita's Organic Mill
 Daybreak Mill
 Fieldstone Organics
 Holy Crap
 MadeGood Foods
 Red River Cereal
 Shreddies
 Sunny Crunch
 Vector
 Coffee—Canada is the 10th-highest coffee consumer, per capita, in the world. 
 Brands: 49th Parallel Coffee Roasters, Kicking Horse, Nabob Coffee, Second Cup, Tim Hortons, Van Houtte, among numerous smaller brands.
 Canadian coffee—a blend of coffee, rye whisky, and maple syrup, often with whipped cream.
 Coffeehouses and doughnut shops
 Baker's Dozen Donuts
 Coffee Time
 Country Style
 Robin's Donuts
 Second Cup
 Tim Hortons
 Condiments
 Chow-chow
 Cretons
 Honey dill sauce
 Honey garlic sauce
 Maple butter
 Maple syrup
 Montreal steak seasoning
 Peanut butter—Marcellus Gilmore Edson was the first to invent the manufactured product in 1884
 Windsor Salt
 Fast food  
 A&W (Canada)
 Burger Baron
 Edo Japan
 Extreme Pita
 Harvey's
 Manchu Wok
 Mr. Sub
 Mucho Burrito
 Pita Pit
 Taco Time
 Thai Express
 Triple-O's
 Ice cream
 Chapman's
 Cows ice cream
 Dickie Dee
 Kawartha Dairy Company
 Laura Secord
 Neilson Dairy
 Swensen's
 Miscellaneous distributors and brands
 Agropur dairy brands, including Natrel
 Kraft Dinner (also a proprietary eponym)
 Lactalis Canada dairy brands, including Black Diamond and Cracker Barrel
 Maple Leaf Foods meat products
 Nature's Path organic food products, including breakfast cereal, granola, and oatmeal
 "No Name" food brand
 Overwaitea Food Group brands, including Western Family
 President's Choice food brand
 Saputo Inc. dairy brands, including Dairyland Canada
 Tim Hortons non-coffee products, such as "timbit" cereal, tea, soup, and granola bars
 Non-alcoholic drinks 
 Bagged milk
 Brio chinotto
 Canadian tea—various tea varieties grown and developed in the Chemainus River valley
 DavidsTea
 Ginger ale (Canada Dry and Sussex Golden)
 Iced Capp
 Labrador (or Hudson's Bay) tea
 London Fog
 Red Rose Tea
 Spruce beer—bière d'épinette, non-alcoholic soft drink from Quebec
 Pizzerias
 241 Pizza 
 Boston Pizza 
 Freshslice Pizza
 Gabriel Pizza
 Greco Pizza Restaurant
 King of Donair
 Mikes
 Mother's Pizza
 Panago
 Pizza 73
 Pizza Delight
 Pizza Nova
 Pizza Pizza
 Pizzaiolo
 Topper's Pizza
 Snacks 
 Dare Foods snack foods, such as Whippets and Wagon Wheels
 Hawkins Cheezies
 Hostess Potato Chips
 Ketchup, salt and vinegar, dill pickle, and "all dressed" flavoured potato chips
 Miss Vickie's kettle-cooked chips
 Nuts and Bolts aka Chex Mix
 Pizza Pops
 Ringolos and Humpty Dumpty Party Mix
 Vachon Bakery snack pastries, such as Jos Louis and May West cakes

Alcohol

Canada is considered one of the top whisky-producing countries, and is most renowned for rye whisky. Regulation states that Canadian whisky must age for a minimum of three years and be kept in oak barrels.  Canada houses about thirty whisky distilleries across the country, and produces 54.2 million liters. Canadian whisky is noted for its light and smooth style, and though most of it is blended, single-malt and 100% rye are some of the country's most desired. The Glenora Inn & Distillery is the only single-malt distillery in North America.

Canada's wine industry is over two-hundred years old and includes the wine regions of British Columbia, Ontario, Quebec, and Nova Scotia. Canada's first commercial vineyard, the Pelee Island Winery, was established in 1866. There are currently over eight-hundred licensed wineries in the country, with the most recognized wine-producing areas being southern Ontario (most notably the Niagara peninsula), and the Okanagan valley of British Columbia.

Straight

 Acerum
 Alcohol Global 94%
 Canadian beer
 Brands (breweries): Alexander Keith's, Granville Island Brewing, Kokanee beer, Labatt, Molson Canadian, Moosehead Breweries, Sleeman Breweries, among others.
 Cream Ale
 Ice beer
 Canadian whisky, commonly referred to as "rye".
 Alberta Premium
 Black Velvet
 Canadian Club
 Crown Royal
 Forty Creek
 Glen Breton
 Gooderham and Worts
 J.P. Wiser's Whisky
 Canadian wine
 Brands (wineries): Burrowing Owl Estate, Henry of Pelham Winery, Inniskillin, Mission Hill Family Estate, Quails' Gate Winery, among others.
 British Columbia wine
 Ice wine
 Granville Island Sake
 Ice cider
 Newfoundland Screech
 Yukon Jack—a Canadian liqueur made of whisky and honey

Mixes

Angry Canadian—a variety of the Old Fashioned, made with a combination of Canadian rye whiskey, bitters, club soda or water, and pure maple syrup
The Caesar—originally called the Bloody Caesar, is a cocktail made from vodka, clamato juice (clam-tomato juice), Worcestershire sauce, and Tabasco sauce, in a salt-rimmed glass (table salt or celery salt), and garnished with a stalk of celery, or more adventurously with a spoonful of horseradish or a shot of beef bouillon.  The Caesar was invented in 1969 in Calgary, Alberta, by bartender Walter Chell, to mark the opening of a new restaurant, "Marco's".
Canadian blueberry sour—a mix of rye whisky, blueberry liqueur, and maple syrup.
Caribou—a mix of red wine, maple syrup, and Canadian whisky; consumed during winter festivals in Quebec
Donald Sutherland—a combination of Canadian rye whiskey and drambuie, prepared with both ingredients poured into an ice-filled old-fashioned glass, then stirred
Mahogany—a combination of Jägermeister, Benedictine, dry vermouth, and cinnamon tincture, prepared with a cocktail glass coated with the cinnamon tincture or cinnamon schnapps
Maple liqueur—sold bottled as Sortilege, this drink combines Canadian whisky and maple syrup
Moose Milk—a cream and spirit (usually rye whisky and dark rum) drink served and consumed at celebratory events of the Canadian Armed Forces 
The Queen Mary—beer mixed with grenadine, with maraschino cherries dropped into the glass as a garnish 
Raymond Massey—a mix of whisky, ginger syrup, and champagne. Named after the Toronto actor.
Rye & Ginger—Canadian whisky and ginger ale
The Toronto—a dry, rich, and mildly bitter cocktail consisting of Canadian whisky, Fernet-Branca, angostura bitters, and either sugar or simple syrup

Street food

While most major cities in Canada offer a variety of street food, each region has specialties which reflect local cultural influences. Montreal food trucks offer shish taouk, the Montreal hot dog, and dollar falafels.  Although falafel is available in Vancouver, East Asian-influenced offerings are much more widespread, including sushi, samosas, Vietnamese banh mi subs or Pho soup, Filipino offerings, and various Japanese and Chinese cuisines. In Victoria, British Columbia, vegan and vegetarian burgers are common, as are various seafood take-aways and Mexican-influenced street food. Since 2007, Toronto has encouraged vendors to sell street food from a wider variety of cuisines.

In Western Canada, a version of the Ukrainian garlic-pork sausage, referred to as "Kubasa" (a corruption of the Ukrainian sausage "Kobasa") is widely available and celebrated. The term "smokies" or "smokeys" may refer to Kubasa rather than frankfurters.

Fusion cultural foods are constantly evolving, such as the Japadog, which tops a hot dog with traditional Japanese ingredients, such as wasabi, teriyaki, shredded daikon radish, or bonito (fish) flakes. Pizza slices are a common street offering. Shawarma is quite prevalent in Ottawa and Windsor, while Halifax offers its own unique version of the döner kebab called the donair, which features a distinctive sauce made from condensed milk, sugar, garlic and vinegar. Ice cream trucks can be seen (and often heard due to a jingle being broadcast on loudspeakers) nationwide during the summer months. Winnipeg has a particularly famous line-up of food truck vendors on Main Street.

Street food markets
Various street food markets exist across the country. Metro Vancouver offers the "Richmond Night Market", with over two-hundred retail stalls offering predominantly East Asian-inspired food, such as grilled octopus, takoyaki, dumplings, fish sticks, and taiyaki. As well, there is the "Shipyards Night Market" in North Vancouver, which is more varied in its offerings and provides more than thirty-five food trucks per week over the course of its annual run.

In Alberta, notable street food markets include the "Calgary Night Market", as well as the "Calgary Stampede Night Market", and Edmonton's "What the Truck?". The Greater Toronto Area runs "Market 707", "Adelaide Eats", and "Night It Up!". Market 707 on Dundas Street is of particular aesthetic note given that it is formed out of refurbished shipping containers. Eastern Canada also maintains several street food markets of note, including Montreal's "First Fridays" and Halifax's "Trusk-Side".

National food of Canada

Though finding consensus among Canadians in determining a national food or dish can prove difficult, there are nonetheless several items broadly recognized as being representative of Canada's national cuisine. Foods typically considered national dishes of Canada include poutine and butter tarts. Canadian back or peameal bacon, as well as Atlantic or Pacific salmon, are also commonly thought of as representative of Canada.

Published by the Statista Research Department, a June 2015 poll asked Canadians, "If Canada were to identify one of the following as official national food, which should it be?" The results revealed Canadian bacon to be the top choice, followed by poutine:
Canadian bacon (35%)
Poutine (30%)
Atlantic or Pacific salmon (17%)
Beavertail (8%)
Toutiere (6%)
Doughnut (4%)

CanCulture Magazine conducted a 2021 social media poll that sampled from fifty-five Canadians given ten choices. The poll revealed the following results:
Poutine (38.9%)
Maple syrup (25.9%)
BeaverTails (9.3%)
Peameal bacon and Timbits (7.4% each)

According to an informal survey by The Globe and Mail conducted through Facebook from collected comments, users considered the following to be the Canadian national dish, with maple syrup likely above all the other foods if it were considered:
Poutine (51%)
Montreal-style bagels (14%)
Salmon jerky (dried smoked salmon) (11%)
Pierogi/Perogy (10%)
Ketchup chips (7%)
Nova Scotian donair (4%)
California roll (1%)

Canada's most "iconic" foods were named in a survey conducted by the Canadian Broadcasting Corporation, in the summer of 2012, as:
Maple syrup
Poutine
Nanaimo bars, smoked salmon and butter tarts

In 2020, Hayley Simpson identified the "best signature Canadian dishes" as poutine, Nanaimo bars, butter tarts, beavertails, tourtière, pea soup, Halifax donair, Saskatoon berry pie, and Montreal-style bagels. The following year, Reader's Digest published an article similarly listing "10 Must-Try Canadian Dishes" as poutine, Canadian bacon, caesar, beavertails, Canadian pizza, butter tarts, Nanaimo bars, split pea soup, tourtière, and ketchup (namely "ketchup" chips).

Meal formats

As in other countries, Canadian meals are commonly segmented accordingly to their suitability for the time of day.

Breakfast takes place in the morning and typically consists of a variety of foods, such as toast, biscuits, muffins, scones, pancakes, bacon, bagels, cereals, fruit and eggs, among others. Breakfast condiments are very common and can often include an assortment of jam, cream cheese, peanut butter, marmalade, or nutella. Typical drinks include water, juice, coffee, and tea. Breakfast traditionally occurs before work or school on weekdays, or otherwise soon after waking up in the morning. An archetypal French-Canadian meal may contain more starch-based material, while an English-Canadian meal might consist of more protein.
 Lumberjack's breakfast, aka logger's breakfast, aka "The Lumby"—a gargantuan breakfast of three-plus eggs, rations of ham, bacon and sausages, and several large pancakes.  This was invented by hotelier J. Houston c.1870, at his Granville Hotel on Water Street in old pre-railway Gastown, Vancouver, in response to requests from his clientele for a better "feed" at the start of a long, hard day of work.

Coffee customarily refers to a small meal during a break from labour. This involves the consumption of a snack that, although it is the typical drink of choice (hence the name), may or may not include coffee. The Canada Labour Code requires employers to provide 30-minute breaks for every five consecutive hours of work.

Lunch generally takes place around noon. Sandwiches, soups, fruit, nuts, cheese and a variety of snacks are common foods during this meal. Lunches are usually compact, utilitarian, and/or casual, particularly given that they are often eaten at work, school, or otherwise outside of the home.

Afternoon tea is a common practice in English Canada and takes place around 16:00. This tradition often overlaps with afterschool snack and is commonly considered to be a marker for the end of one's daily obligations, whether it be work or school.

Dinner usually takes place from anywhere between 17:00 to 19:00, and tend to be heartier affairs based around protein and vegetables. Local flora and fauna are most fully realized during dinner; in the Maritimes, dinner may be more likely to include fish, while the Prairies might include more beef.
 Sunday dinner in Canada is commonly observed as a more formal affair than typical dinners, often involving family and/or guests, and a more thoroughly prepared meal. Roast beef is a common centerpiece, but particular specialties also vary by region, such as traditional Prairie pot roast and Newfoundland Jiggs Dinner.

Occasions

 Chinese buffet or smorgasbord is a particular meal system invented in Gastown, Vancouver and prevalent throughout the country. This style of buffet was developed in the 19th century by Chinese immigrants in order to cater to the local clientele of Scandinavian Canadian loggers. Staples of Chinese-Canadian cuisine, as well as North American Chinese cuisine broadly, such as ginger beef, chow mein, and dumplings, are commonly available.
 Christmas dinner in Canada draws from the traditions of both Britain and France. These dinners are typically meant to serve a larger group than is usual, with the pièce de résistance often being turkey, roast beef, and/or ham. Sides often include stuffing, mashed or roast potatoes, gravy, cranberry sauce, and cooked vegetables (such as carrots or yams). Pies and cakes are common desserts. Treats during the Christmas season typically include tarts, shortbread and gingerbread, bar, square, and "snowball" pastries, toffee, roll kuchen (particularly in the Prairies), crème brûlée, and biscotti. Easter weekend (April), Victoria Day weekend (May), and Canadian Thanksgiving (October) tend to share certain culinary customs with Christmas, albeit with different ingredients based on seasonality.
 Pancake breakfast is a traditional public meal, particularly in Western Canada, which takes place during festivals, celebrations, and community events. This tradition has roots in the Prairies' ranching culture, as well as the Christian tradition of Shrove Tuesday. Such events that take part in a pancake breakfast include the Calgary Stampede, Grey Cup festival, and K-Days.
 Potlatch is a gift-giving feast practiced by Indigenous peoples of the Pacific Northwest. Although the occasion as a whole incorporates complex political, social, and economic elements, feasting is still a central aspect of the practice.
 Réveillon is a long dinner held in the evenings preceding Christmas Day and New Year's Eve, and is a traditional practice for French-Canadians across the country. Meals tend to be particularly opulent, and may include lobster, oysters, escargot, foie gras, and tourtière. A traditional dessert for this occasion is yule log.

Food festivals
Various food festivals take place annually across Canada and in accordance with seasonality, often in celebration of a local culinary tradition or industry. The list below is a selection of food festivals by region (giving their location and standard month(s) of occurrence), and is not exhaustive.

British Columbia
BC Seafood Festival (Comox Valley; June)
Dine Out Vancouver Festival (Vancouver; January to February)
Eat! Vancouver (Vancouver; May)
Half Corked Marathon (Osoyoos; October)
Sun Peaks Winter Okanagan Wine Festival (Sun Peaks; January)
Surrey Fusion Festival (Surrey; July)

Prairies

Corn and Apple Festival (Morden; August)
Folklorama (Winnipeg; July to August)
Foodtruck Wars (Saskatoon; July)
Festival du Voyageur (Winnipeg; February)
Taste of Edmonton (Edmonton; July)
The Big Taste (Calgary; March)
The Great Saskatchewan Mustard Festival (Regina; August)

Ontario

A Taste of Niagara-on-the-Lake (Niagara-on-the-Lake; January, March and April)
Canada's Largest Ribfest (Burlington; August to September)
Elmira Maple Syrup Festival (Elmira; April)
Icewine Festival (Niagara-on-the-Lake; January)
Oktoberfest (Kitchener–Waterloo; October)
Ontario's Best Butter Tart Festival (Midland; June)
Ottawa Poutine Fest (Ottawa; October to November)
Summerlicious (Toronto; July)
Taste of the Danforth (Toronto; August)
WinterBrewed (Ottawa; February)
Winterlicious (Toronto; January to February)

Quebec

Montréal en Lumière (Montreal; February)
Festibiere de Quebec (Quebec City; August)
Taste of the Caribbean (Montreal; July)

Maritimes
Dine Around Freddy (Fredericton; March)
Prince Edward Island Fall Flavours Festival (Charlottetown; September)
Shediac Lobster Festival (Shediac; June to July)
The Gathering (Burlington, Newfoundland and Labrador; August)
WinterDine (Charlottetown; January to February)

North
Yukon Culinary Festival (Whitehorse; August)

Livestock breeds and cultivars

While an abundance of livestock breeds and crops originating from other countries are grown and raised in Canada, there is also a variety of unique breeds and cultivars that have been developed domestically. Below is a selection of various livestock breeds and cultivars that originate from Canada.

Apples

Due to an influx of grain from the Prairies into British Columbia during the late 19th century, via the advent of the Canadian rail network, the province's grain production became largely redundant. This allowed for the development of specialized produce industries, such as fruit in the Okanagan. As a result, many of Canada's unique apple varieties have been developed in the interior of British Columbia.
Ambrosia 
Aurora Golden Gala
Battleford
Creston
Golden Nugget
Jubilee
McIntosh
Melba
Nicola
Nova Easygro
Spartan 
Wijcik McIntosh
Beans
CDC Blackstrap
CDC Floral
CDC Ray
CDC Sol
CDC Sunburst
CDC Whitetrack
CDC WM-2
CDC WM-3
Majesty
Wolfe
Cattle

Canadienne
Hays Converter
Lynch Lineback
Speckle Park
Cherries

Lapins cherry
Saskatoon Prairie cherry
Skeena cherry
Stella cherry
Sweetheart cherry
Van cherry
Pigs
Lacombe
Miniature, or "Teacup"
Potatoes

There are over sixty potato varieties that originate from Canada. Many of these were developed by Agriculture and Agri-Food Canada, largely in New Brunswick, but also in Alberta, Newfoundland, Ontario, and Quebec. The following is a small sampling of Canadian potatoes:
Abeille
Blue Mac
Carlton
Eramosa
Fundy
Glenwood Red
Island Sunshine
Hunter
Maple Gold
Pacific Russet
Red Gold
Yukon Gold
Poultry
Chantecler
Red Shaver
Ridley Bronze turkey
Sheep

Canadian Arcott
Newfoundland
Outaouais Arcott
Rideau Arcott
Strawberries
Annapolis
Brunswick
Cabot
Cavendish
Chambly
Evangeline
Glooscap
Kent
Mira
R14
Sable
Saint Pierre
Sapphire
Serenity
Totem
Valley Sunset
Wendy
Yamaska
Other berries
Aurora haskap
Boreal Beauty haskap
Boreal Beast haskap
Boreal Blizzard haskap
Borealis haskap
Tulameen raspberry
Other breeds and cultivars

Brookred plum
Canada Red rhubarb
Canola
Coronation grape
Harrow Crisp pear
Harrow Sweet pear
Jedediah Island goat
Marquis wheat
Montreal melon
Red Fife wheat

See also

 Agriculture in Canada
 Anna Olson
 Canadian Chinese cuisine
 Cuisine of Quebec
 Cuisine of the Maritime Provinces (Canada)
 Cuisine of Toronto
 Jean Paré
 Margo Oliver
 North American cuisine
 Pacific Northwest cuisine
 Rob Feenie
 Rocky Mountain cuisine

References

Further reading

External links

 CBC Digital Archives – My Canada Includes Tourtière
 Canadian Packaged Food Image Gallery 

 
North American cuisine
Arctic cuisine